Sedalia is the name of several places:

Canada
Sedalia, Alberta, a hamlet in Alberta, Canada

United States
Sedalia, Colorado
Sedalia, Indiana
Sedalia, Kentucky
Sedalia, Missouri, the largest US city named Sedalia
Sedalia, North Carolina
Sedalia, Ohio, also known as Midway
Sedalia, South Carolina
Sedalia, Texas
Sedalia, Virginia
Sedalia, West Virginia

See also
Sedalia is also the name of a type of Stone Age arrowhead
Sedilia, a type of chair